Vae, VAE or Vaé may refer to
Vae (name)
 Vae caecis ducentibus! Vae caecis sequentibus!, Latin for "woe to the blind that lead, woe to the blind that follow", Augustine of Hippo, Contra epistulam parmeniani Libri tres, Lib. III, 4:24, cited by Blaise Pascal in his Lettres provinciales, Onzième lettre "Aux pères jésuites".
Variational autoencoder, Machine learning model.
Vae victis, Latin for "woe to the vanquished"
Vae Victis (album) by Signal Aout 42
Vae Solis, debut album by Scorn
VAE Nortrak North America, Inc., a manufacturer of railroad track components
Validation des Acquis de l'Experience, a procedure of granting degrees based on work experience in France